Salvatore Bettiol (born 28 November 1961 in Volpago del Montello) is a retired long-distance runner from Italy.

Biography
He represented his native country twice (1992 and 1996) at the Summer Olympics. He is best known for finishing in 2nd place overall at the 1988 New York Marathon, and for winning the 1987 Venice Marathon. He also finished in 4th place overall at the 1990 European Championships in Split, FR Yugoslavia.

Achievements

National titles
Salvatore Bettiol has won 4 times the individual national championship.
2 wins in Marathon (1987, 1991)
2 wins in Half marathon (1986, 1988)

References

External links
 
 Salvatore Bettiol at RAI

1961 births
Living people
Italian male long-distance runners
Italian male marathon runners
Athletes (track and field) at the 1992 Summer Olympics
Athletes (track and field) at the 1996 Summer Olympics
Olympic athletes of Italy
World Athletics Championships athletes for Italy